Hedwig "Vicki" Baum (January 24, 1888 – August 29, 1960) was an Austrian writer. She is known for the novel Menschen im Hotel ("People at a Hotel", 1929 — published in English as Grand Hotel), one of her first international successes. It was made into a 1932 film and a 1989 Broadway musical.

Education and personal life
Baum was born in Vienna into a Jewish family. Her mother Mathilde (née Donath) suffered from mental illness, and died of breast cancer when Vicki was still a child. Her father, described as "a tyrannical, hypochondriac" man, was a bank clerk who was killed in 1942 in Novi Sad (present-day Serbia) by soldiers of the Hungarian occupation. She began her artistic career as a musician playing the harp. She studied at the Vienna Conservatory and played in the Vienna Concert Society. She went on to perform in Germany – in Kiel, Hannover, and Mannheim – in the years 1916–1923. She later worked as a journalist for the magazine Berliner Illustrirte Zeitung, published by Ullstein-Verlag in Berlin.

Baum was married twice. Her first, short-lived marriage, in 1906, was to Max Prels, an Austrian journalist who introduced her to the Viennese cultural scene; some of her first short stories were published under his name. They divorced in 1910, and in 1916, she married Richard Lert, a conductor. They had two sons, Wolfgang (b. 1917) and Peter (b. 1921).

Boxing
Baum took up boxing in the late 1920s. She trained with Turkish prizefighter Sabri Mahir at his Studio for Boxing and Physical Culture in Berlin. Although the studio was open to men and women, Baum writes in her memoir, It Was All Quite Different (1964), that only a few women (including Marlene Dietrich and Carola Neher) trained there: “I don’t know how the feminine element sneaked into those masculine realms, but in any case, only three or four of us were tough enough to go through with it.” Positioning herself as a “New Woman,” she asserted her independence in the traditionally male domain of boxing and challenged old gender categories. She writes that “Sabri put one limitation on women – no sparring in the ring, no black eyes, no bloody noses. Punching the ball was okay, though, to develop a pretty mean straight left, a quick one-two; a woman never knew when she might have to defend herself, right?” While training with Mahir, Baum mastered a rope-jumping routine that was designed for German heavyweight champion Franz Diener. She later credited her strong work ethic to the skills instilled in Mahir's studio.

Writing career
Baum began writing in her teens but did not turn to writing professionally until after the birth of her first son. Her first book, Frühe Schatten: Die Geschichte einer Kindheit (Early Shadows: The Story of a Childhood, 1919), was published when she was 31. Thereafter she published a new novel nearly every year, with a career total of more than 50 books, at least ten of which were adapted as motion pictures in Hollywood. Her ninth novel, Stud. chem. Helene Willfüer (Helene), was her first major commercial success, selling over 100,000 copies. Baum is considered one of the first modern bestselling authors, and her books are seen as exemplifying New Objectivity within contemporary mainstream literature. Her protagonists were often strong, independent women caught up in turbulent times.

Baum is most famous for her 1929 novel Menschen im Hotel ("People at a Hotel"), which introduced the genre of the 'hotel novel'. It was made into a stage play in Berlin in 1929, directed by Max Reinhardt, and an Academy Award winning film, Grand Hotel, in 1932. Baum emigrated to the United States with her family after being invited to write the screenplay for this film. She settled in the Los Angeles area and worked as a screenwriter for ten years, with moderate success. With the rise of National Socialism in Germany, her literary works were denigrated as sensationalist and amoral and banned in the Third Reich as of 1935. She became an American citizen in 1938, and her post-World War II works were written in English rather than in German.

Baum visited Mexico, China, Egypt and Bali in 1935; and became close friends with the painter Walter Spies. With historical and cultural input from Spies, she wrote Liebe und Tod auf Bali, which was published in 1937 and translated into English as Love and Death in Bali. The book was about a family that was caught in the massacre in Bali in 1906 at the fall of the last independent kingdom in Bali to the Dutch.

Last years and death

Baum's reputation went into a decline following World War II. She died of leukemia in Hollywood, California in 1960, aged 72. Her memoir It Was All Quite Different was published posthumously in 1964.

Honors
In 1999, the corner of Wiedner Hauptstraße and Waaggasse in Vienna was named Vicki-Baum-Platz in her honor. In 2009, a street was named after her in Berlin.

Works
 1919 Frühe Schatten: Die Geschichte einer Kindheit (Early Shadows: The Story of a Childhood)
 1920 Der Eingang zur Bühne (The Entrance to the Stage)
 1921 Die Tänze der Ina Raffay (The Dances of Ina Raffay, republished as Kein Platz für Tränen in 1982)
 1922 Die anderen Tage (The Other Days)
 1923 Die Welt ohne Sünde (The World Without Sin)
 1924 Ulle der Zwerg (Ulle the Dwarf)
 1926 Tanzpause (Pause in the Dance)
 1927 Hell in Frauensee (Martin's Summer)
 1927 Feme
 1928 Stud. chem. Helene Willfüer (Helene)
 1929 Menschen im Hotel (Grand Hotel)
 1930 Zwischenfall in Lohwinkel (Incident in Lohwinkel, Results of an Accident in the UK, and And Life Goes On in the US)
 1930 Miniaturen (Miniatures)
 1931 Pariser Platz 13 ("13 Paris Square")
 1932 Leben ohne Geheimnis (Published in the UK and US as Falling Star, 1934)
 1935 Das große Einmaleins / Rendezvous in Paris (The Great Multiplication / Rendezvous in Paris)
 1936 Die Karriere der Doris Hart (The Career of Doris Hart)
 1937 Liebe und Tod auf Bali (Love and Death in Bali) 
 1937 Hotel Shanghai (Also printed in the UK under the name "Nanking Road")
 1937 Der große Ausverkauf (The Big Sell-Off) Querido, Amsterdam.
 1939 Die große Pause (The Big Break)
 1940 Es begann an Bord (The Ship and the Shores or It Began On Board) 
 1941 Der Weihnachtskarpfen (The Christmas Carp)
 1941 Marion lebt (Marion Alive; republished as Marion in 1954)
 1943 Kautschuk / Cahuchu, Strom der Tränen (The Weeping Wood) 
 1943 Hotel Berlin/ Hier stand ein Hotel (Hotel Berlin/ Here Stood A Hotel, a sequel to Menschen im Hotel )
 1946 Verpfändetes Leben (Mortgage on Life)
 1947 Schicksalsflug (Flight of Fate)
 1949 Clarinda
 1951 Vor Rehen wird gewarnt (Deer Warning)
 1953 The Mustard Seed 
 1953 Kristall im Lehm (Krystal Clay)
 1956 Flut und Flamme (Written on Water)
 1957 Die goldenen Schuhe (Theme for Ballet)
 1962 Es war alles ganz anders (It Was All Quite Different) -- memoir

Filmography 
 Assassination, directed by Richard Oswald  (Germany, 1927, based on the novel Feme)
 The Three Women of Urban Hell, directed by Jaap Speyer  (Germany, 1928, based on the novel Hell in Frauensee)
 Stud. chem. Helene Willfüer, directed by Fred Sauer  (Germany, 1930, based on the novel Stud. chem. Helene Willfüer)
 Grand Hotel, directed by Edmund Goulding  (1932, based on the novel Grand Hotel)
 Lake of Ladies, directed by Marc Allégret  (France, 1934, based on the novel Hell in Frauensee)
 Helene, directed by Jean Benoît-Lévy  (France, 1936, based on the novel Stud. chem. Helene Willfüer)
 Return at Dawn, directed by Henri Decoin  (France, 1938, based on the short story Between 6 and 6)
 The Great Flamarion, directed by Anthony Mann  (1945, based on the short story Big Shot)
 Hotel Berlin, directed by Peter Godfrey  (1945, based on the novel Hotel Berlin)
 Week-End at the Waldorf, directed by Robert Z. Leonard  (1945, based on the novel Grand Hotel)
 A Woman's Secret, directed by Nicholas Ray  (1949, based on the novel Mortgage on Life)
 La Belle que voilà, directed by Jean-Paul Le Chanois  (France, 1950, based on the novel Die Karriere der Doris Hart)
 Le Château de verre, directed by René Clément  (France, 1950, based on the novel Das große Einmaleins)
 The Red Needle, directed by Emil-Edwin Reinert  (France, 1951, based on the short story Das Joch)
 Dreaming Days, directed by Emil-Edwin Reinert  (West Germany, 1951, based on the short story Das Joch)
 School for Love, directed by Marc Allégret  (France, 1955, based on the novel Der Eingang zur Bühne)
 , directed by Rudolf Jugert  (West Germany, 1956, based on the novel Stud. chem. Helene Willfüer)
 Love, directed by Horst Hächler  (West Germany, 1956, based on the novel Vor Rehen wird gewarnt)
 Menschen im Hotel, directed by Gottfried Reinhardt  (West Germany, 1959, based on the novel Grand Hotel)
 Die goldenen Schuhe, directed by Dietrich Haugk  (West Germany, 1983, TV miniseries, based on the novel Die goldenen Schuhe)
 Shanghai 1937, directed by Peter Patzak  (TV miniseries, Germany, 1997, based on the novel Hotel Shanghai)

Screenwriter 
 1934: I Give My Love (dir. Karl Freund)
 1935: The Night Is Young (dir. Dudley Murphy)
 1938: The Great Waltz (uncredited) (dir. Dudley Murphy)
 1940: Dance, Girl, Dance (dir. Dorothy Arzner)
 1942: Powder Town (dir. Rowland V. Lee)
 1942: Girl Trouble (dir. Harold D. Schuster)
 1945: Behind City Lights (dir. John English)
 1947: Honeymoon (dir. William Keighley)

Dicta 
 "A woman who is loved always has success".
 "Fame always brings loneliness. Success is as ice cold and lonely as the North Pole".
 "Marriage always demands the greatest understanding of the art of insincerity possible between two human beings".
 "Pity is the deadliest feeling that can be offered to a woman".
 "To be a Jew is a destiny".
 "There are shortcuts to happiness and dancing is one of them".

References

External links 
 
 
 Vicki Baum (in German) from the archive of the Österreichische Mediathek

Jewish American writers
Female wartime nurses
Austrian women in World War I
Austrian Jews
American people of Austrian-Jewish descent
Deaths from leukemia
Deaths from cancer in California
People with acquired American citizenship
Writers from Vienna
20th-century Austrian women writers
1888 births
1960 deaths
Female nurses in World War I
German women writers
20th-century Austrian screenwriters
Austrian emigrants to the United States